Robert Roy Farmer (7 December 1892 – 1 April 1951) was an Australian rules footballer who played with St Kilda in the Victorian Football League (VFL).

Notes

External links 

1892 births
1951 deaths
Australian rules footballers from Victoria (Australia)
St Kilda Football Club players